Year 433 (CDXXXIII) was a common year starting on Sunday (link will display the full calendar) of the Julian calendar. At the time, it was known as the Year of the Consulship of Theodosius and Maximus (or, less frequently, year 1186 Ab urbe condita). The denomination 433 for this year has been used since the early medieval period, when the Anno Domini calendar era became the prevalent method in Europe for naming years.

Events 
 By place 

 Roman Empire 
 Flavius Aetius returns to Italy with the support of the Huns. He gains control over the young emperor Valentinian III, and becomes his "protector".
 Petronius Maximus is appointed consul of the Western Roman Empire.

 By topic 

 Religion 
 Pope Sixtus III helps to settle a Christological dispute between the patriarchs Cyril of Alexandria and John of Antioch, that has continued since the First Council of Ephesus, two years ago. They sign the "Formula of Reunion", thus ending their conflict over Nestorianism.

Births 
 Liu Bing, high official of the Liu Song Dynasty (d. 477)

Deaths 
 Juqu Mengxun, prince of the Xiongnu state Northern Liang (b. 368)
 Xie Lingyun, Chinese poet of the Southern and Northern Dynasties (b. 385)
 Huiguo, Chinese Buddhist Abbess (b. 364)

References